This is a list of characters from the Berenstain Bears, an American children's book series.

Main characters of the series
The protagonists of this series are the members of the Bear family. In The Big Honey Hunt, the first Berenstain Bears book, the family consisted of Mama Bear, Papa Bear, and their son Small Bear. In 1974, Small Bear was renamed Brother Bear, and authors Stan and Jan Berenstain added Sister Bear to the family. In 2000, they added Honey, a baby daughter.

Papa Bear is the father of the family. He works as a professional carpenter. At the same time, he loves fishing, hunting, eating, drinking and spending time in the woods. He is often portrayed as clumsy and bumbling, though well-meaning. He also loves honey. He is a light disciplinarian (although prone to overreacting when pushed past his limit), often leaving those responsibilities to Mama or assuming the cubs are simply young and will learn as they grow.  He tends to think he is above the rules, often resulting in him being used as an example by Mama or having to pay the price in chores. He was voiced by Brian Cummings in 1985 and Benedict Campbell in 2003.  
Mama Bear is the mother of the family. She likes to make quilts, work in the garden, and take care of her family. She is gentle and she always wants to settle things peacefully, although she can occasionally lose her temper. She is the main disciplinarian of the family and often uses chores or housework to teach lessons and responsibility. She is strongly opposed to guns and gambling. She was voiced by Ruth Buzzi in 1985 and Camilla Scott in 2003.
Brother Bear (formerly Small Bear before Sister Bear's birth) is Papa Bear and Mama Bear's ten-year-old son who is in Teacher Bob's fifth grade class. Brother loves all sports but his favorite is soccer. He is often heard to say, "soccer is how I get my kicks". He is also a big fan of T. Rex dinosaurs and model airplane building. Sometimes he lifts up rocks to see what strange bugs lurk underneath. Brother is shown to be more quiet than Sister Bear, and he's always willing to make friends. He was voiced by David Mendenhall in 1985 and Michael Cera and later Michael D'Ascenzo in 2003.
Sister Bear is Papa Bear and Mama Bear's eight-year-old daughter who is in Teacher Jane's third grade class. Her hobbies include playing with dolls and her best friend Lizzy Bruin. She also is quite athletic, which showed in various books that she plays baseball with her brother and runs the "Bear Country 3-mile run" with her family. She can be greedy about her toys, though this generally results in her learning a lesson at the end of the book. Her birth was chronicled in 1974's The Berenstain Bears' New Baby; when she first met Brother Bear as a baby, she punched him instead of greeting him, but they quickly became loyal towards each other. She's best friends with Lizzy Bruin and, to a lesser extent, Queenie and Babs Bruno. She's more social and outgoing than Brother Bear. She was also jealous of the arrival of the new baby Honey Bear and was mad at her family because she felt that her baby sister has replaced her position in the family. She was voiced by Christina Lange in 1985 and Tajja Isen in 2003.
Honey Bear is the youngest member of the family, and the last to be introduced in the series. Though she can only say a few words, she is considered smart as a baby. She was first introduced in 2000 in The Berenstain Bears and Baby Makes Five, after the series dealt with Mama Bear's pregnancy in The Birds, the Bees, and the Berenstain Bears. Between the two books, there was a contest for readers to name the baby, and the winning name was Honey (the winner was Christian Greaves of Rochester, New York). She is absent in the 2003 series though it can be seen that Sister and Honey, Mama's cousin Audra's daughter have a close relationship in The Berenstain Bears Go to the Doctor but she is seen as possibly three years old.

Supporting characters
Lady (formerly Little Lady) is the Bear family's loving dog. Brother & Sister Bear adopted her from Farmer Ben's farm in The Berenstain Bears' The Trouble With the Pets. Voiced by Emily Brachur as a grown dog and by Fiona Earl as a little puppy.
Too-Tall Grizzly is the tough, troublemaking school bully. He is the leader of a schoolyard gang and, as his name indicates, he is a head taller and larger than the other cubs in his class, though still the same age as them. He has an older sister named Too-Much; their father and mother are Two-Ton and Too-Too, respectively. In the 1985 TV series, Too-Tall is drastically taller, wears a different outfit, and leads a different gang as opposed to in the books, as well as being much less prominently featured. In the 2003 TV series, Too-Tall gradually becomes less of a thuggish bully and more of the cubs' gruff frenemy with a soft side the more he mellows out and befriends Brother Bear. Voiced by Brian Cummings in 1985 and by Gage Knox in 2003.
Queenie McBear is Too-Tall's on-and-off girlfriend, a feminist, and a friend of Brother and Sister. also sometimes being depicted as a crush to Brother Bear in the books, and gets a somewhat crush on Ferdy in the 2003 series, although she originally used him to do Too-Tall's homework and hers, she eventually befriends him near the end. Although she initially bullies Sister, she later becomes friendly to all the cubs at school. In the books, she is the new cub in town that starts an 'in crowd' and excludes Sister for being too small, wearing bows, and riding a tricycle. In the 2003 series, she has been shown to always be a friend of Sister. She is very flirtatious.  Although she is Brother's age and classmate in the books, she is inconsistently shown in both Brother and Sister's classrooms in the 2003 TV series. Voiced by Meg Drew.
Cousin Freddy is Brother, Sister, and Honey's cousin and best friend. He is often referred to as Cousin Fred. His father, Artie and Papa Bear are brothers. He likes to read the dictionary for fun, and tends to be cowardly. He owns a hound dog named Snuff. In the 2003 series, he does not own a dog but a chameleon named Carl and is shown to be allergic to chocolate in The Pet Show and Papa's Pizza. Voiced by Marc McMulkin.
Elizabeth "Lizzy" Bruin is one of Sister's best friends. She is very competitive and can be snobbish at times. In the books and 1985 series, she is a new cub in town that Sister befriends immediately, but they fight during a playdate and temporarily stop being friends. In the 2003 series, they have been best friends since the first day of Kindergarten, and Lizzie is implied to come from a more well off family, as she is said to have every "Bearbie" doll. Voiced by Ava Lengi in 1985 and by Amanda Soha in 2003.
Bonnie Brown is a part-time model who attends Bear Country School and befriends with Brother and Sister. Bonnie and Brother Bear are sometimes portrayed as having a crush on the other. Bonnie is a very caring and sweet cub, and the niece of Squire and Lady Grizzly. She was first introduced in the Big Chapter Book series.
Raffish Ralph: is a con man who typically works as a swindler. He also goes by the name Ralph Ripoff. Though he is scheming and underhanded, he maintains a somewhat cordial relationship with Papa, Brother, and Sister. He appears in one storybook, the chapter books, and the Berenstain Bears Save Christmas! music album. In the 1985 TV series, he is mostly seen working with Weasel McGreed in an attempt to take over Bear Country. Voiced by Frank Welker.
Weasel McGreed is a weasel who is an antagonist in the 1985 TV series. In the show, he attempts to take over Bear Country on numerous occasions, only to have his plans foiled by Brother and Sister each time. He also works alongside Raffish Ralph during his schemes. Voiced by Frank Welker.
Farmer Ben is the local farmer, a neighbor and friend to the Bear Family and Papa Bear's best friend. Though essentially good-hearted, he can lose his temper when he feels things are unfair or not to his standards. He once hired Brother, Sister, and their friends to help with chores when he and his wife were about to lose their farm. In one of the chapter books, he is angry when protesters come by to demand he stop harvesting tobacco. Voiced by Louis von Demeanor.
Mrs. Ben is Farmer Ben's wife. It is hinted that she often tells Farmer Ben what to do. Voiced by Eve Hensen.
Squire Grizzly is the richest bear in all of Bear Country and a friend to Papa. Papa often does woodwork for the squire in "Grizzly Mansion", the squire's home. He has a touchy relationship with Farmer Ben, over who owns the land adjacent to his. Voiced by John Reed.
Lady Grizzly is Squire Grizzly's wife. She is also a friend to the Bear family, though it is hinted that she wishes the Bears were more in their class of people. Voiced by Lillian DeKai.
Grizzly Gramps and Gran are Papa Bear's parents. Gramps likes to build ships in a bottle and complain about the government. Gran likes to plant flowers and tell other bears their fortunes for fun. In the 2003 series, Sister Bear learns more about Gran's past and her involvement in the community, such as entertaining sick people, fighting to keep a lake from being filled with dirt, and was the one to get a crossing guard for the school. Grizzly is voiced by Harold Kegten, and Gran is voiced by Corinne Conley.
Horace J. Honeypot is the mayor of Bear Country, known for his numerous spoonerisms, but in the storybooks and the 2003 series, he is known to speak normally. Voiced by Patrick Floan and later by Brian Cummings in the 1985 series.
Professor Actual Factual is the community intellectual, always pictured as slim and bespectacled. He is a good friend of Brother and Sister, and the purveyor and owner of the Bearsonian Institution, Bear Country's museum. Voiced by Owen J. Siloce.
Bigpaw is a giant of a bear, a throwback to prehistoric cave bears. As his name suggests, he is the bear version of Bigfoot. He lives in a cave and hibernates. Never shown wearing anything but his own fur and foraging/fishing for sustenance, he is also referred to in the books as "Great Natural Bear". Despite his size and appearance however, Bigpaw Bear is often portrayed as a gentle giant. Voiced by Jermeny Higgins.
Ferdy Factual, or "Nerdy Ferdy", is Actual Factual's nephew, and an unusually intelligent cub. Though he adjusts slowly to life at Bear Country School, he becomes close friends with Brother, Sister, and their friends, and he even stands up to Too-Tall and his gang on occasion. He has a crush on Queenie. Voiced by Xavier Quinn.
Bill Bunny is a hare who appears in the television specials and the chapter books. Voiced by Penelope Little.
Benjamin Frog is a frog who in the television specials and the chapter books. Voiced by Deanne Wood.
Firefly is a firefly in the television specials and the chapter books. Voiced by Anna Taylor.
Trudy Brunowitz is a nerdy female cub and a friend of Ferdy. Voiced by Haley Breaup.
Harry McGill is the first disabled cub in the series. He made his debut in The Berenstain Bears and the Wheelchair Comando in the Big Chapter Book series. He is smart and is good friends with Ferdy. After standing up to Too-Tall, he eventually became his chess buddy. He also helps new cubs adjust to Bear Country School.
Bertha Broom is a muscular female cub. She is athletic, kind, and a feminist. She is one of the few cubs to stand up to Too-Tall on a regular basis. She is a heavyweight on Bear Country School's wrestling team and a fullback on the football team. In the 2003 series, she is known as Betsy.
Milton Chubb is a fifth grader who is probably the largest cub in school. Milton is the target of sarcasm when he first arrived at the school (especially by Too-Tall and his gang), but he adjusts in time. He joins the wrestling team and is good friends with all the cubs, especially Bertha, his secret crush.
Lenny is a cub who appears in the 2003 TV series. Though he means well, some of his actions can come off as selfish or sinister, such as joking that Sister would make the baseball team and Brother wouldn't, or showing up late to the movies and leaving Brother to find a seat alone while he snags a good seat.
Skuzz is the second-in-command of Too-Tall's gang. He wears a whoopee cap and is as ruthless as Too-Tall.
Smirk is the silly one of Too-Tall's gang, though he is still sarcastic. He wears a baseball cap, which he sometimes wears sideways or backwards, and likes to build model airplanes in his spare time.
Vinnie is the least intelligent member of Too-Tall's gang. He wears a snow cap similar to that of a skater, though only for looks (although in several books, he is seen without a hat), and usually does not understand the jokes told by the rest of the gang. In the 2003 TV series, he is only occasionally seen and never speaks.
Unnamed Bully is a member of Too-Tall's gang who does not appear in as many books as the other gang members, nor appears in either TV series. He wears a beanie-like baseball cap and primarily appears in the First Time Books.
Dr. Gert Grizzly is Beartown's doctor. She is a kind person who advocates healthy eating.
Babs Bruno is the daughter of Beartown's police chief, Chief Bruno. A feminist and aspiring poet, she is good friends with Queenie and Bertha. She also occasionally hangs out with Sister and Bonnie.
Barry Bruin is Lizzy's older brother, although Lizzy is initially portrayed as having no siblings. He loves to tell and play jokes, but he is always willing to help his friends. He is mentioned in the books and the 2003 series, mainly in 'The Big Blooper', when Sister and Lizzie watch one of his movies and repeat the bad language (the book implying it to be an actual curse word, while the 2003 series uses the word "furball").
Teacher Bob is the fifth grade teacher in Bear Country School. Easygoing but firm, he teaches Brother, Fred, Too-Tall, and Queenie.
Teacher Jane is the third grade teacher in Bear Country School and the Bear Scout troop leader. Very gentle and soft-spoken, she teaches Sister and Lizzy.
Chief Bert Bruno is the police chief of Beartown and the father of Babs. He often calls on the Bear Detectives to help him solve local crimes, though he worries that they may get hurt while dealing with criminals. His assistant deputy is Officer Marguerite.
Officer Marguerite is Bear Country's main police officer. She is the only officer mentioned in the books.

Minor characters
Grumpy Grizzly is the Bear Country School groundskeeper. As his name states he is usually very grumpy, though he gains a brief change of attitude when the whole school shows appreciation for his work. Grumpy Grizzly is also known around Bear Country as a drinker. 
Handybear Gus is the Bear Country School's original groundskeeper. He only appears in The Berenstain Bears Go to School.
Honey Bear: (not to be confused with the youngest member of The Bear Family) is a character that appears in The Cat's Meow and Forget Their Manners.
Mrs. Smith is a teacher who puts on a talent show in the poem book The Berenstain Bears and the Talent Show.
Dr. Bearson is a dentist, who Sister fears will yank out her tooth after Brother tells her about his yankers. He only appears in The Berenstain Bears Visit the Dentist.
Two-Ton Grizzly is Too-Tall's father and he thinks he's the strongest bear in Bear Country. He owns "Parts R Us", Bear Country's local junkyard.
Teacher Harriet is one of Bear Country School's two sixth-grade teachers. Bermuda is in her class.
Mr. Smock is Bear Country School's new art teacher. Queenie develops a crush on him. His favorite food is honey-cured salmon. In the 2003 TV series, he was renamed Art Drewberry.
Fred Furry is owner of Beartown's only theater, the "Bearjou".
Gil Grizzwold is a character who makes sporadic appearances but does not speak much. He appears to be good friends with Ferdy and Harry, but does not talk much with Brother or Sister.
Mervyn "Bullhorn" Grizzmeyer is the school's coach and vice principal. A no-nonsense, strict disciplinarian, he is constantly keeping Too-Tall in line. He has dictatorial tendencies, having set up a strict dress code that fails after a few weeks, and is not afraid to put anyone in line, even Papa Bear.
Mr. Herbert Honeycomb is the principal of Bear Country School. He appears to be laid-back but in charge, since most of the discipline is carried out by Mr. Grizzmeyer. In The Berenstain Bears and the Bully, he is said to be very strict about fighting.
Miss Glitch is Bear Country School's other fourth-grade teacher and also the English teacher. Similar to Mr. Grizzmeyer in personality, she loves poetry and classical music. Though well-meaning, she often serves as a nemesis to Brother, Sister, and their friends.
Miss Honeybear is the kindergarten teacher at Bear Country School. She only appears in The Berenstain Bears Go to School.
Anna and Millie are friends of Sister who play jump rope with her. They only appear in a few books.
Bermuda McBear is Queenie's older cousin in the sixth grade, though she acts more like a teenager. She is a bigger flirt than Queenie, and the object of attention of many of the boys in the school.
Biff Bruin is Lizzy's dad. He runs the Beartown pharmacy. He has a wife who is mentioned in a few books. Both of them appear in the TV series.
Willie and Min Bear are Fred's parents. Min is Mama Bear's sister.
Miz Mcgrizz is a woman who the cubs believe to be an evil witch, though she turns out to be friendly when they trick or treat at her house. She appears in The Berenstain Bears Trick or Treat.
Mrs. Grizzle is a large, elderly bear who comes to babysit Brother and Sister from time to time. They initially fear her, but she quickly becomes their favorite. She appears in The Berenstain Bears and The Sitter and The Birds, The Bees, and The Berenstain Bears. She is a recurring character in the 2003 TV series.
Grizzly Ted runs a summer camp whom the cubs attend during their vacation. He appears in The Berentstain Bears Go to Camp. In the 2003 TV series, he is also the school bus driver.
Kitten Salesman is a salesman whose job is to sell poorly made toy "Kitty Cats". He gives some to Brother and Sister and makes their parents buy them.
Space Grizzlies are little action figures that Brother is obsessed with. After going to Bear Country Mall, Brother sees a movie poster  that says Space Grizzlies: The Movie, which is based on the Space Grizzlies action figures. He later sees the movie in the movie theater. After that, he has a nightmare. The Space Grizzlies are only seen in The Berenstain Bears and the Bad Dream.
Santa Bear is a cartoon bear version of Santa Claus. He only appears in The Berenstain Bears Meet Santa Bear.
Tuffy is a girl cub about Sister's age who bullies her until Sister stands up for herself after taking self-defense lessons from Brother. She only appears in The Berenstain Bears and the Bully.
Grizzly Gus: is a salesman who only appears is the Christmas-themed poetry book The Berenstain Bears Christmas Tree and corresponding special where he owns a Christmas tree business.
Mr. Mail Bear: is a mailman.
Boss Bunny is a bunny who makes his only appearance in The Berenstain Bears' Easter Surprise.
Parter Pete is a man who only appears in The Berenstain Bears and the Bigpaw Problem.
Kinder Kevin is another man who only appears in The Berenstain Bears and the Bigpaw Problem.
Jeepers is a fisherman who only appears in The Berenstain Bears Meet Bigpaw.
Charlene is a bear who only appears in The Berenstain Bears' Comic Valentine.
Beekeeper Brian is a beekeeper who appears in the 2003 episode On the Job.
Frog and Butterfly: Two non-anthropomorphic forest characters that play with Sister Bear in several episodes of The Berenstain Bears Show.
Queen Nectar: A character from The Berenstain Bears Show who is in charge over making "Wild Wild Honey". She and Papa Q. Bear are enemies with each other because he wants to collect their honey. He gets stung if he even approaches them. Other times they will hunt him down just so they can attack. She has a truce with the rest of The Bear Family as long as they do not bother her honey collection.
Mr. Eagle: Mr. Eagle and Papa Q. Bear were at odds with each other in The Berenstain Bears' Christmas Tree. In search of a tree for Christmas, Papa almost cut down a tree that was off limits. Mr. Eagle parodied E Pluribus Unum when he took Papa's axe and he was also shown to be an expert at throwing Papa's own axe towards him. The two forgave & forgot by the end of the special.

List character
Fictional bears
Lists of fictional animals by work
Lists of fictional animals in literature